Robert Simpson Woodward (July 21, 1849 – June 29, 1924) was an American civil engineer, physicist and mathematician.

Biography
He was born at Rochester, Michigan on July 21, 1849, to Lysander Woodward and Peninah A. Simpson.

He graduated with a degree in civil engineering at the University of Michigan in 1872. He was appointed assistant engineer on the United States Lake Survey.  In 1882 he became assistant astronomer for the United States Transit of Venus Commission.  In 1884 he became astronomer to the United States Geological Survey, serving until 1890, when he was hired by Thomas Corwin Mendenhall as assistant in the United States Coast and Geodetic Survey.  In 1893 he was called to Columbia as professor of mechanics and subsequently became professor of mathematical physics as well.  He was dean of the faculty of pure science at Columbia from 1895 to 1905, when he became president of the Carnegie Institution of Washington, whose reputation and usefulness as a means of furthering scientific research was widely extended under his direction.  He was elected to the National Academy of Sciences in 1896.  In 1898-1900 he was president of the American Mathematical Society, and in 1900 he became President of the American Association for the Advancement of Science.  In 1902, he was elected as a member to the American Philosophical Society. In 1915 he was appointed to the Naval Consulting Board.

He died on June 29, 1924 in Washington, D.C.

Legacy
Professor Woodward carried on researches and published papers in many departments of astronomy, geodesy, and mechanics.  In the course of his work with the United States Coast and Geodetic Survey he devised and constructed the "iced bar and long tape base apparatus," which enables a base line to be measured with greater accuracy and with less expense than by methods previously employed.  His work on the composition and structure of the earth and the variation of latitude found expression in a number of valuable papers.

Publications
 Geographical Tables (1897; third edition, 1906)  
 Probability and Theory of Errors (1906).

See also

 Robert Simpson Woodward House

References

American science writers
American civil engineers
American astronomers
1849 births
1924 deaths
University of Michigan College of Engineering alumni
19th-century American mathematicians
20th-century American mathematicians
People from Rochester, Michigan
United States Coast and Geodetic Survey personnel
Presidents of the American Mathematical Society
Members of the United States National Academy of Sciences
Naval Consulting Board
Members of the American Philosophical Society